Wheathill may refer to:

Wheathill, Shropshire, a village and civil parish in Shropshire, England
Wheathill, Somerset, a hamlet in the parish of Lovington, Somerset, England
Wheathill, County Fermanagh, a place in County Fermanagh, Northern Ireland

See also
 Wheat Hill, a mountain in the Catskill Mountains of New York
 Wheatville (disambiguation)